Zarechnaya is a rural locality (a village) in Zhiryatinsky District, Bryansk Oblast, Russia. The population was 115 as of 2010. There are 2 streets.

Geography 
Zarechnaya is located 9 km northeast of Zhiryatino (the district's administrative centre) by road. Knyazhichi is the nearest rural locality.

References 

Rural localities in Zhiryatinsky District